Los Angeles Historic-Cultural Monuments (LAHCMs) in Downtown Los Angeles, Los Angeles, California are designated by the City's Cultural Heritage Commission. There are more than 120 LAHCMs in the downtown area. These include the Old Plaza Historic District, Little Tokyo, Chinatown, the Broadway Theater District, the Spring Street Financial District, and the Fashion District.

Current and former Historic-Cultural Monuments

Listed in the National Register of Historic Places

See also

Lists of L.A. Historic-Cultural Monuments

 Historic-Cultural Monuments on the East and Northeast Sides
 Historic-Cultural Monuments in the Harbor area
 Historic-Cultural Monuments in Hollywood
 Historic-Cultural Monuments in the San Fernando Valley
 Historic-Cultural Monuments in Silver Lake, Angelino Heights, and Echo Park
 Historic-Cultural Monuments in South Los Angeles
 Historic-Cultural Monuments on the Westside
 Historic-Cultural Monuments in the Wilshire and Westlake areas

Other
 City of Los Angeles' Historic Preservation Overlay Zones
 National Register of Historic Places listings in Los Angeles
 National Register of Historic Places listings in Los Angeles County
 List of California Historical Landmarks

Notes

References

External links 
 Los Angeles Office of Historic Resources: Designated L.A. Historic-Cultural Monuments (LAHCM) website — with 'ever-updated' LAHCM List via PDF link.
 Historic-Cultural Monument (HCM) Report for Central City
 Historic-Cultural Monument (HCM) Report for Central City North
 Big Orange Landmarks:  "Exploring the Landmarks of Los Angeles, One Monument at a Time" — Central City L.A.H.C. Monuments.  — online photos and in-depth history. — website curator: Floyd B. Bariscale.
 Big Orange Landmarks:  "Exploring the Landmarks of Los Angeles, One Monument at a Time" — Central City North L.A.H.C. Monuments.

 

Downtown
Los Angeles-related lists